Unicolors, Inc. v. H&M Hennes & Mauritz, L.P., 595 U.S. ___ (2022), was a United States Supreme Court case in which the Court held that a lack of either factual or legal knowledge can excuse an inaccuracy in a copyright registration.

References

External links
 

2022 in United States case law
United States Supreme Court cases
United States copyright case law
United States Supreme Court cases of the Roberts Court